Philip Osborn is a male former swimmer who competed for England.

Swimming career
Osborn represented England and won two silver medals in the 4 x 100 metres and 4 x 200 metres freestyle relays, in addition to competing in the individual freestyle events, at the 1982 Commonwealth Games in Brisbane, Queensland, Australia.

He swam for the Beckenham Club.

References

English male swimmers
Commonwealth Games medallists in swimming
Commonwealth Games silver medallists for England
Swimmers at the 1982 Commonwealth Games
Medallists at the 1982 Commonwealth Games